Tony Bennett's "Something" is a 1970 studio album by Tony Bennett. As with Bennett's previous album, Tony Sings the Great Hits of Today!, it contains renditions of contemporary pop songs, including "Something", which had appeared on the earlier release. In recording Something, Bennett largely avoided the physical disgust he had with the previous album, a change that an Allmusic review credited to more tasteful arrangements.

The album cover shows Bennett embracing his infant daughter, Joanna.

Track listing
 "Something" (George Harrison) – 3:19
 "The Long and Winding Road" (John Lennon, Paul McCartney) – 4:43
 "Everybody's Talkin'" (Fred Neil) – 3:41
 "On a Clear Day (You Can See Forever)" (Burton Lane, Alan Jay Lerner) – 3:40
 "Coco" (Lerner, André Previn) – 3:00
 "Think How It's Gonna Be" (Lee Adams, Charles Strouse) – 3:53
 "Wave" (Antonio Carlos Jobim) – 4:37
 "Make It Easy on Yourself" (Burt Bacharach, Hal David) – 4:32
 "Come Saturday Morning" (Fred Karlin, Dory Previn) – 	4:25
 "When I Look in Your Eyes" (Leslie Bricusse) – 3:45
 "Yellow Days" (Alan Bernstein, Álvaro Carrillo) – 4:01
 "What a Wonderful World" (Bob Thiele, George David Weiss) – 4:22

Personnel

Performance
 Tony Bennett - vocal
 Peter Matz - arranger, conductor

References

1970 albums
Tony Bennett albums
Albums produced by Teo Macero
Columbia Records albums
Albums conducted by Peter Matz
Albums arranged by Peter Matz